The 2021–22 season is Fortitudo Bologna 90th in existence and the club's 3rd consecutive season in the top tier Italian basketball.

Kit 
Supplier: Adidas / Sponsor: Kigili

Players

Current roster

Depth chart

Squad changes

In 

|}

Out

|}

Confirmed 

|}

Coach

On loan

Competitions

Supercup

Serie A

References 

2021–22 in Italian basketball by club